Molloy University is a private Roman Catholic university in Rockville Centre, New York.  It provides more than 50 academic undergraduate, graduate, and doctoral degree programs for over 5,000 undergraduate, graduate, and doctoral students.

History 
In 1941 the Sisters of St. Dominic purchased 25 acres in Rockville Centre. In 1955 the Dominican Sisters of Amityville founded Molloy Catholic College. It was established as a women's college appointing Mother Anselma Ruth, O.P., Ph.D., as the first president. A year later the first institutional building called Quealy Hall opened. Soon after, Mother Bernadette de Lourdes, O.P., was appointed as the second president followed by the opening of Kellenberg Hall. In 1959 the first commencement ceremony took place celebrating the first graduating class. In 1971 its name was changed to Molloy College. In 1972 it began accepting men into the nursing program and in 1982 became fully coeducational. In 2014, CAP21 joined forces with Molloy University.

In March 2022, the New York State Board of Regents approved the name change from Molloy College to Molloy University. The school announced on March 31, 2022, that the name change would be effective June 1, 2022.

Student life 
Molloy University offers over 60 clubs and organizations. Some are founded on academics but others are centered around a cultural theme.

Molloy has three residence halls that house nearly 350 students, Maria Regina, Fitzgerald, and Bogner Hall, which opened in August, 2019.
Dorms are co-ed but the halls and wings are separated by gender. Students living on campus have a choice of three different meal plans, and the school provides daily shuttle service for dining, shopping, or the train.

The Madison Theatre at Molloy University opened in the late fall of 2011. The 550-seat theater hosts a variety of performers from the world of theater, music, dance, cabaret, comedy and more. Madison Theatre's Artistic Director is Angelo Fraboni, a Broadway performer who has produced and managed a range of Off-Broadway productions and tours.

Faculty
Molloy University's academic structure has four distinct schools (Business, Education & Human Services, Nursing & Health Sciences, and Arts & Sciences) under which individual academic departments fall.  The Provost is the senior administrator for Molloy College academics.

The Barbara H. Hagan School of Nursing & Health Sciences is regarded as one of the premiere schools of its kind in the country, offering undergraduate and graduate degrees in nursing and health sciences ranging from bachelor’s degrees through the Ph.D. The school was named with the support of a gift from the family of Barbara H. Hagan. 

The School of Education and Human Services offers undergraduate and graduate degrees including bachelor’s, master’s, and doctoral programs in Education, Clinical Mental Health Counseling, and Social Work. The Ed.D. program in Educational Leadership for Diverse Learning Communities is part of the Carnegie Project on the Education Doctorate. The Education undergraduate and graduate programs are accredited by the Council for Educator Preparation (CAEP), and deliver a value-centered, multidimensional experience that provides students with the tools to become effective teachers.

The School of Business at Molloy University is accredited by the International Accreditation Council for Business Education (IACBE) and deploys an executive-based instructional model offering undergraduate degrees and graduate degrees, including the M.B.A.  The curriculum incorporates the institution’s values in the Dominican tradition to educate ethical leaders for our communities. 

The School of Arts and Sciences offers majors in the arts, humanities, sciences, and social sciences that offers a strong liberal arts core for all majors at the university, while providing professional pathways for students. Faculty in the Arts and Sciences lead the university’s First-Year Experience, Honors Program, and the Common Reading Program. The School offers 17 undergraduate degree majors and 2 graduate programs, and is home to the CAP21 Theatre Arts major that recruits musical theatre students from around the country.

With a student-faculty ratio of 10 to 1, Molloy offers smaller class sizes than most universities. Both retention rates and graduation rates at Molloy outpace national averages, and student success metrics have placed Molloy University in the top 50 nationally as a “best value” institution in a ranking by Niche. Molloy employs 190 full-time faculty, with 87% holding terminal degrees in their field. About three quarters of Molloy University faculty are part-time faculty..

Athletics 
Molloy athletic teams are the Lions. The college is a member of the Division II level of the National Collegiate Athletic Association (NCAA), primarily competing in the East Coast Conference (ECC; formerly known as the New York Collegiate Athletic Conference (NYCAC) until after the 2005–06 academic year) since the 1989–90 academic year.

Molloy has 19 intercollegiate varsity sports: Men's sports include baseball, basketball, cross country, lacrosse, soccer, track & field (indoor and outdoor); while women's sports include basketball, bowling, cross country, field hockey, lacrosse, rugby, soccer, softball, tennis, track & field (indoor and outdoor) and volleyball.

The Molloy College softball team made it to the NCAA Division II World Series in 2013. During the 2014–15 season, two of Molloy College student-athletes were named All-American selections.

Notable alumni
 Shea Spitzbarth - professional baseball player
 Jaylen Morris - professional basketball player

References

External links
 
 Official athletics website

 
Universities and colleges on Long Island
Educational institutions established in 1955
Dominican universities and colleges in the United States
Universities and colleges in Nassau County, New York
1955 establishments in New York (state)
Catholic universities and colleges in New York (state)
East Coast Conference schools